Wenshui County is a county in the west-central part of Shanxi Province, China. It is under the administration of the prefecture-level city of Lüliang.

Climate

References

 www.xzqh.org 

County-level divisions of Shanxi